De'Anthony is a given name. Notable people with the name include: 

De'Anthony Melton (born 1998), American basketball player
De'Anthony Thomas (born 1993), American gridiron football player

See also

D'Anthony
Dee Anthony

Masculine given names